"Next Lifetime" is a song recorded by American singer Erykah Badu for her debut studio album Baduizm (1997). It was written by Badu and Anthony Scott. A mid-tempo ballad, the song describes being in a relationship but longing for another man. At the start of the song, Badu is heard talking to a man about how they can't be together even though they both have feelings for one another.

Music video
The accompanying music video for "Next Lifetime" starts with the title "a story by Erykah Badu". 
It then shows Badu and the man she longs for in three different time frames–or "lifetimes"–including "Motherland, 1637 A.D.", "The Movement, 1968" and "Motherland, 3037". Pete Rock, Method Man and Badu's then-boyfriend André 3000 all appeared in the video.

Track listings and formats

UK 12-inch vinyl
 "Next Lifetime" (album version) – 6:30
 "Next Lifetime" (Linslee Remix) – 4:45
 "Next Lifetime" (live) – 10:57
 "Next Lifetime" (radio edit) – 4:15
 "Next Lifetime" (instrumental) – 6:30

UK cassette and European CD single
 "Next Lifetime" (radio edit) – 4:15
 "Next Lifetime" (Linslee Remix) – 4:45

UK maxi CD single
 "Next Lifetime" (radio edit) – 4:15
 "Next Lifetime" (album version) – 6:30
 "Next Lifetime" (Linslee Remix) – 4:45
 "Next Lifetime" (live) – 10:57
 "Next Lifetime" (instrumental) – 6:30

Japanese maxi CD single
 "Next Lifetime" (album version) – 6:30
 "Next Lifetime" (radio edit) – 4:15
 "Next Lifetime" (instrumental) – 6:30
 "On & On" (dance mix) – 3:50

Charts

Release history

Notes

References

1997 singles
Erykah Badu songs
Songs written by Erykah Badu
1997 songs
Soul ballads
1990s ballads
Contemporary R&B ballads